Donalbain is a character in William Shakespeare's Macbeth (c. 1603–1607).  He is the younger son of King Duncan and brother to Malcolm, the heir to the throne.  Donalbain flees to Ireland after the murder of his father for refuge.

He is based upon a personage in an account of King Duncan in Holinshed's Chronicles, a history of Britain familiar to Shakespeare. He is ultimately based on the historical King Donald III of Scotland.

In the original text of the First Folio his name is spelled Donalbaine, and is sometimes also spelled Donaldbain. His name is derived from the Scottish Gaelic Dòmhnall Bàn, "Donald the Fair."

Origin
Shakespeare's Donalbain is based upon 'Donald Bane' in the account of King Duncan from Holinshed's Chronicles (1587). There, he makes his only appearance in the narrative after King Duncan is murdered. He then decides to seek refuge in Ireland, where the reader is informed that he was "cherished by the king of that land". After his departure, Macbeth uses "great liberality" toward the Scottish nobles in order to gain their favour and rules capably for seventeen years before he is defeated by Malcolm and his English forces. Holinshed's historical personage is Donald III of Scotland.

Historically, Donalbain (Donald Ban/Donald the Fair) seized the Scottish throne after the death of Malcolm and reigned intermittently a few years but was ultimately succeeded by Malcolm's son Edgar.

Role in the play
Donalbain appears in a few early scenes in the play as a silent member of his father's entourage.  He speaks only in 2.3 when, after his father's murder, he decides to flee to Ireland.  His brother decides to seek refuge in England.  Donalbain tells Malcolm that their "separated fortune / Shall keep us both the safer".  With his father and brother, Donalbain represents moral order in the play, and contributes to the father/son motif of the play.

Although it is easy to argue that Donalbain does not contribute to the play, granted his lack of appearance, he plays his role by supporting Malcolm as his brother and Duncan as his father. He is also a boost to the King's character, as neither of his sons are involved in foul play in the play. 

The ending of Roman Polanski's film adaptation of Macbeth, in which Donalbain, returning to Scotland after the death of Macbeth, hears the witches murmuring in the heather and gets off his horse to investigate, alludes to the historical fact that Donald III seized the throne after the death of Malcolm.

References

External links
Macbeth: Folio Version
Macbeth: Full-text online

Literary characters introduced in 1603
Male Shakespearean characters
Characters in Macbeth
Fictional Scottish people
Fictional princes
Fictional characters based on real people